Gerald Clervil (born 25 April 1976) is a former Haitian track and field athlete who competed in the men's 400m event at the 2000 Summer Olympics. He recorded a 46.69, placing him 8th in his heat. His personal best is 45.71, raced in 1999.

References

Living people
1974 births
Haitian male sprinters
Athletes (track and field) at the 2000 Summer Olympics
Olympic athletes of Haiti